Patrick Seubo Koshoni (17 April 1943 – 25 January 2020) was a Nigerian Navy Vice Admiral, former Chief of Naval Staff who had served as minister for Health during administration of General Buhari. During his tenure as health minister, he tried to promote a national insurance program that would provide medical treatment without requiring a down payment.

Early life and education
Born in Lagos on April 17, 1943, Patrick  Koshoni joined the Nigerian Navy on the 11 of June 1962 after a  secondary school education at St Finbarr's College, Akoka Lagos. That same year he started the naval cadetship training at the National Defence Training Academy in India and was commissioned Sub-Lieutenant on 16 July 1964.

Career
Admiral Koshoni attended many naval, management and leadership courses and headed many naval and military appointments, committees and task forces. He was a three-time minister in various military regimes, heading the ministries of Health, Transport and Aviation, Employment, Labour and Productivity. He was appointed Chief of the Naval Staff from October 1986 to January 1990, after several years of political appointments.

Vice Admiral Koshoni's tenure as CNS led to the Nigerian Navy Trident Strategy which articulated the Nigeria's maritime strategic imperatives while streamlining the acquisition of platforms for the appropriate size and shape of the NN. Other initiatives under his tenure included Manpower Rationalisation, Training Programmes, Logistic Reform and morale boosting Welfare Schemes.

References

1943 births
Living people
Nigerian Navy admirals
Federal ministers of Nigeria
Chiefs of Naval Staff (Nigeria)